Kaled Gourmi, first name sometimes spelt as Khaled, (born April 16, 1986) is an Algerian football player who plays for Régional 2 club Conflans FC.

Career

Club career
In September 2009, Gourmi was loaned out by FC Baulmes to BSC Young Boys. However, injuries limited him to just two appearances for Young Boys before his loan deal was terminated in February.

On August 19, 2011, Gourmi signed a two-year contract with ES Sétif. He made his debut for the club on September 10, 2011, coming on as a second-half substitute in a league game against NA Hussein Dey. A few weeks later, on October 1, he scored his first goal for Sétif, converting from the penalty spot in a 3–2 loss to USM El Harrach.

After a short spell with FC Saint-Leu 95 in the Championnat National 3, 33-year old Gourmi returned to Régional 2 club Conflans FC in January 2020, the club he also played for in 2018.

Honours
 Won the Algerian Cup once with ES Sétif in 2012

References

External links
 
 

1986 births
Algerian footballers
French footballers
French sportspeople of Algerian descent
Algerian expatriate footballers
Footballers from Paris
Living people
Algeria A' international footballers
BSC Young Boys players
ES Sétif players
Nuorese Calcio players
Yverdon-Sport FC players
MC Alger players
Al-Shahania SC players
FC Baulmes players
Algerian Ligue Professionnelle 1 players
Qatar Stars League players
Swiss Promotion League players
Swiss Challenge League players
Swiss Super League players
Championnat National 3 players
Association football midfielders
Expatriate footballers in Belgium
Expatriate footballers in Italy
Expatriate footballers in Qatar
Expatriate footballers in Switzerland
Algerian expatriate sportspeople in Belgium
Algerian expatriate sportspeople in Italy
Algerian expatriate sportspeople in Qatar
Algerian expatriate sportspeople in Switzerland